"Dog Day Sunrise" is a song originally by British band Head of David, from their 1988 album, Dustbowl.

Fear Factory version

"Dog Day Sunrise" was covered by heavy metal band Fear Factory on their second studio album, Demanufacture. It was released as the second and final single from the album.

The song reached No. 85 on the UK chart, but did not chart on any of the US charts.

Track listing

References 

Fear Factory songs
1996 singles
Roadrunner Records singles
1988 songs